This is a list of notable fictional radio stations.  At least eleven different TV shows have used a radio station as a setting.

According to Michael Hawk of Real TV Addict, the top five fictional stations on (American) television are WKRP, WNYX, KBHR, WENN, and KACL.

United States
Bounce FM - from Grand Theft Auto: San Andreas
CSR 103.9 - from Grand Theft Auto: San Andreas
GNR – In the videogame Fallout 3, this is the Washington, D.C. station where Three Dog talked about the wastes and hosts a one-man radio show, Galaxy News Radio.
KAB/1340-Antonio Bay, California. Radio station housed in a lighthouse in The Fog.
KACL 780 AM – is the radio station in Seattle which is the setting for Frasier. It was named after creators, Angell, Casey and Lee plus the standard letter K for stations located west of the Mississippi.  Its format is talk radio and briefly was a salsa station.  Several other fictional radio stations, KPXY, KQZY, KJSB, KAZW and KTLK are also mentioned or featured in the show. In 1997 an actual FM station in Bismarck, North Dakota signed on with the KACL call letters.
KBAL/1200: a religious radio station transmitting from Mount Zaphon in AM1200 (film).
KBAL – SportsTalk radio station where Ryan King is a personality on the NBC sitcom, Go On. While an exact location isn't explicitly listed, its alluded to be somewhere in the southern California region.
KBBL and KBBL-FM (AM 970, FM 102.5) – radio stations in The Simpsons. The letters of the call-sign suggest babble and the Tower of Babel. Nominal competitors are KJAZZ-FM and KFSL – Fossil 103 (there is a real KFSL-LP in Fossil, Oregon) KUDD Radio is a commercial radio station located in the town of Weevilville in Spittle County.   KUDD's broadcast area includes Springfield. There is actually a real-life station with the KUDD call letters in Salt Lake City, Utah on 105.1 FM, with a Top 40 format, named "Mix 105.1" 
KBHR 570 AM – from Northern Exposure, it is the local station of fictional town Cicely, Alaska.
K-DST - from Grand Theft Auto: San Andreas
KFLH – a radio station (FM 95.6) based in San Francisco, featured in several episodes of Full House as an employer of two of the main characters, Jesse and Joey, and features the radio talk show Rush Hour Renegades.
KGAB – Dallas, Texas – KGAB is a real radio station in Cheyenne, Wyoming, but the call sign was used in the movie Talk Radio. The movie was made in 1988 and as KGAB's current call sign only dates back to 1997; it is unknown if the call letters was taken as a result of the movie.
K-JAH West - from Grand Theft Auto: San Andreas
KJCH Based in San Francisco, featured on Charmed ("The Devil's Music").
KJCM/98.3 – San Francisco talk radio station which aired "Jack Killian, The Nighthawk" on Midnight Caller.
KLKB - Salt Lake City, Utah featured on Resident Evil: Extinction
KLOG-AM-FM – A 1976 SNL sketch in which Dan Aykroyd plays a DJ who juggles simultaneous shows on a screaming AM and a mellow underground FM. The only location referenced is the vague "Summit."
KLOW – Portland, Oregon station where Larry Alder worked on the sitcom Hello, Larry.
KODY and KYDS – from the Adventures in Odyssey.
KQSF (108.6 FM) Based in San Francisco, featured on Charmed ("Valhalley of Dolls").
K-Rose - from Grand Theft Auto: San Andreas
KSAD – Los Angeles, heard in Naked Gun : The Final Insult. Its slogan is, "All depressing, all the time".
KSND – Sandcastle, California, heard in the Scary Story Time podcast based in the fictional town of Sandcastle. Its slogan is, "KSND the Sound of the Sea".
KUKU - Setting for the 1930s NBC Blue Network musical variety series The Cuckoo Hour.
KZUK — An unnamed town in the midwest found in the book Beautiful Music For Ugly Children by Kirstin Cronn-Mills under a radio station by the same name as the book.
Master Sounds 98.3 - from Grand Theft Auto: San Andreas
Playback FM - from Grand Theft Auto: San Andreas 
 Q-SKY, a Los Angeles rock station featured in the 1978 movie FM. 
Radio Los Santos - from Grand Theft Auto: San Andreas
Radio X - from Grand Theft Auto: San Andreas

SF-UR - from Grand Theft Auto: San Andreas
W Balls 187.4, featured on the 1993 Snoop Dogg album Doggystyle and the 1994 Death Row Records soundtrack album Murder Was the Case.
WAXX – A radio station, at or around 1500 kHz, that airs a top 40 format and serves as continuity for the musical Grease. (In the film version, it carries the call sign KZAZ.) Vince Fontaine, one of the characters in the musical, is a disc jockey at the station.
WCTR - from Grand Theft Auto: San Andreas
WENN – set in Pittsburgh, an old-time radio station that was the focus of the Emmy award-winning television series Remember WENN.
WEZY – Mississippi radio station where the "Soggy Bottom Boys" record "Man of Constant Sorrow" in O Brother, Where Art Thou?
WHOGG – Hazzard County's only radio station on The Dukes of Hazzard.
WJBB – Cleveland, Ohio, Hot in Cleveland
WKDK – Boston, Massachusetts, "the Thought of Boston"  has talk host Jimmy Winston who interviews detective Spenser about the Red Rose killer in Robert B. Parker's novel Crimson Joy.
WKRP – Cincinnati, Ohio, WKRP in Cincinnati and The New WKRP in Cincinnati TV shows (formerly easy listening, turned into rock and Top 40 for both series). The show was considered revolutionary for its use of music for the fictional station. WKRP's rival is WPIG, whose mascot was a pig (and which is not to be confused with the real WPIG). In 2015 an actual FM station, WKRP-LP, began broadcasting in Raleigh, North Carolina.
WLT – Minneapolis, Minnesota, setting for the Garrison Keillor novel WLT: A Radio Romance. Call sign derived from the slogan "With Lettuce and Tomato".
WNYX 585 AM – AM news station in New York City from NewsRadio. The entire series takes place in, about and around the goings on at the station. Other stations mentioned in the show are WRMH, WYXP, and WXYP.
WOLD – of Boise, Idaho, from the song "W·O·L·D" by Harry Chapin.
 WORD (A.K.A Ant's Radio Station) – WordWorld
WPIG 95.7 – unrelated to WPIG Cincinnati. Rock station set in Aurora, Illinois in the movie Wayne's World 2. Partially based on a real-life country music station with the same call sign and frequency in Olean, New York.
WQHG 97.1 Quahog, Rhode Island. Featured in several episodes of the television show Family Guy. Main characters Brian and Stewie host a show on the station in one episode. The station is known for its show "Weenie and the Butt", which is a reoccurring gag regarding shock radio shows. 
WQRY 88.1 – Campus Radio – college-based (after the owner of the station donated it to the Rockland University)  radio station in the fictional town of Grandview, New York, from the season 5 episode Dead Air of Ghost Whisperer. WQRY Campus Radio 88.1 featured the show "Drivin' with DJ Dean Olson", that unintentionally caused a deadly accident when a prank call went wrong.
WREQ – from Homefront, it is the local station of fictional town River Run, Ohio. WREQ was also the callsign of a competing station which offered Venus Flytrap a job in WKRP in Cincinnati. Additionally, WREQ features as a local station in the unnamed city that provides the setting for Hill Street Blues.
WTNV – of Welcome to Night Vale.
WUSA – is the setting of the film of the same name, which depicts it as a talk radio station in New Orleans, Louisiana.
WYBS 88.3 – from Under the Dome, is a radio station in the small town of Chester's Mill.
WZAZ -  Chicago station in the movie Airplane! "where disco lives forever!", whose building-mounted antenna is knocked over by a passing passenger jet. Call letters are derived from the last names of directors David Zucker, Jim Abrahams and Jerry Zucker.
WZAZ - in an episode of the TV show The Odd Couple, "The New Car", in which Dick Clark has a cameo as a DJ.
WZAZ - A station on 88.4 FM in the 1974 movie The Longest Yard.
WZPZ - a fictional rock and roll radio station heard on a radio (notably playing David Bowie in the "Wilderness Survival Badge" scene) in the Amazon Studios movie Troop Zero. WZPZ was also used in House of Cards as a Pittsburg-based radio station through which Congressman and gubernatorial election candidate Peter Russo attended an interview drunk within weeks from the gubernatorial elections.

Saints Row video game series feature a large number of in-game radio stations.

Canada
CFRZ-AM 660, Mercy, Saskatchewan – A fictional radio station in the show "Little Mosque on the Prairie."
CIBJ-FM – a fictional campus radio station set in Toronto, Ontario from Drop the Beat, a spin-off of Straight Up.
 QWRP – from the fictional town of Nsburg, featured in the Qwerpline sketch series by Canadian comedy troupe LoadingReadyRun.
Radio Free Roscoe – a fictional pirate radio station created by four teen characters in the show of the same name.
Radio Enfer – in the show of the same name, a high school radio station.

United Kingdom
Crucial FM – a fictional pirate radio station on the Lenny Henry comedy TV series on BBC 1.
Forever FM – a fictional commercial radio station in Peter Kay's Car Share.
Kurupt FM (108.9)  – a fictional pirate radio station in People Just Do Nothing.
Radio Active – from the radio series of the same name. (There is a real Radio Active in Wellington, New Zealand)
Radio Fab FM – the setting for the Smashie and Nicey sketches in Harry Enfield's Television Programme.
Radio Norwich, North Norfolk Digital & Shape – I'm Alan Partridge
Radio Rock – pirate rock-and-roll radio station broadcast from an offshore boat; from the movie The Boat That Rocked (known as Pirate Radio in the United States)
Radio Roo – a fictional radio station featured in the children's program of the same name.
Radio Shuttleworth – from the radio series of the same name.
Radio West – workplace of the TV detective Shoestring.
 The Jolly Roger – A pirate radio station in a 1966 episode of Danger Man with Patrick McGoohan (called Secret Agent in the United States)
 Waller FM – A comedy sketch podcast produced by David Firth based around the fictitious radio station.
Dover Radio – featured in the BBC TV series Missing set around in a busy under-resourced missing persons unit.

Australia
PirateNet is a school-based community radio station which first appeared in Neighbours in 2009.  Later that year, British singer Lily Allen made a cameo appearance at the radio station.

Netherlands
Radio Bergeijk is a Dutch satirical radio programme of which Peer van Eersel and Toon Spoorenberg are the anchormen. They are played by the comedians George van Houts and Pieter Bouwman respectively. The first episode was broadcast on April 3, 2001 from 00:44 to 01:00. From then on, a new episode could be heard every weekday. In January 2004 the programming of the Dutch radio changed dramatically and Radio Bergeijk was forced to broadcast just every Saturday from 13:30 to 14:00 on Radio 1.
Radio Fiets is a Dutch fictional radio station created in 1999. They are active on social media and on their own website. In 2012 they posted 10 tips to ride your bicycle through snow.

Extraterrestrial
LIVE 34 – Earth Colony 34 news station in the Doctor Who audio drama of the same name.

Japan
FM No. 10 – Sailor Moon ("Talk Radio") and Sailor Moon Sailor Stars ("Duty or Friendship: Conflict Between the Sailor Guardians")
Morioh Cho Radio-Jojo's Bizarre Adventure - Diamond Is Unbreakable("Music Radio")
MRS (Mount Moiwa Radio Station, FM 82.6) – a fictional FM radio station in Mount Moiwa, Sapporo, Hokkaido from Wave, Listen to Me!("Talk Radio")

France
WDPK 83.7 FM – a fictional FM radio station that in the song of the same name on the Daft Punk album Homework.

See also
List of fictional television stations

References

 
Radio stations
Fictional
 List of fictional radio stations